Montenegrins refers to South Slavic people associated with Montenegro.

Montenegrins may also refer to:
 Montenegrins (demonym), citizens of Montenegro
 Old Montenegrins, inhabitants of the historical "Old Montenegro" region
 Serb Montenegrins, Montenegrin citizens of Serb ethnicity
 Croat Montenegrins, Montenegrin citizens of Croat ethnicity
 Bosniak Montenegrins, Montenegrin citizens of Bosniak ethnicity

In other geographic regions
 Montenegrins of Serbia, a national minority of ethnic Montenegrins in Serbia
 Montenegrins of Kosovo, form an ethnic minority in Kosovo
 Montenegrins of Bosnia and Herzegovina, a national minority of ethnic Montenegrins in Bosnia and Herzegovina
 Montenegrins of Croatia, a national minority of ethnic Montenegrins in Croatia
 Montenegrins in Albania, form an ethnic minority in Albania
 Montenegrins of North Macedonia, a national minority of ethnic Montenegrins in the Republic of North Macedonia
 Montenegrins of Slovenia, a national minority of ethnic Montenegrins in Slovenia
 Montenegrin Americans, USA citizens who are by origin from Montenegro
 Montenegrin Canadians, Australian citizens who are by origin from Montenegro
 Montenegrin Australians, Australian citizens who are by origin from Montenegro
 Montenegrins in Argentina, members of Montenegrin diaspora in Argentina

See also
Montenegrin (disambiguation)
Montenegro (disambiguation)